The Stephen Van Rensselaer House at 149 Mulberry Street between Grand and Hester Streets in the Little Italy neighborhood of Manhattan, New York City, was built c.1816 in the Federal style by Stephen Van Rensselaer III.  It was originally located on the northwest corner of Mulberry and Grand, but in 1841 was moved down the block to its current location. The two-story dormered house is typical of Federal-style row houses which were common at the time in Manhattan below 14th Street.

The house was designated a New York City landmark in 1969, and in 1983 was added to the National Register of Historic Places.

See also
National Register of Historic Places listings in Manhattan below 14th Street
List of New York City Designated Landmarks in Manhattan below 14th Street

References
Notes

External links
 

Chinatown, Manhattan
Houses completed in 1819
Houses on the National Register of Historic Places in Manhattan
New York City Designated Landmarks in Manhattan
Van Rensselaer family